Tim Skarke (born 7 September 1996) is a German professional footballer who plays as a winger for Bundesliga club Schalke 04, on loan from Union Berlin.

Club career
Skarke is a youth graduate from 1. FC Heidenheim. On 27 September 2015, he made his 2. Bundesliga debut in a 1–1 draw against Karlsruher SC.

On 31 May 2019, it was confirmed that Skarke would join SV Darmstadt 98 for the upcoming season.

On 31 May 2022, Skarke signed a contract with Union Berlin.

On 23 January 2023, he agreed to join Schalke 04 until the end of the season, with an option to make the deal permanent.

Career statistics

References

1996 births
Living people
German footballers
Association football midfielders
Germany under-21 international footballers
1. FC Heidenheim players
SV Darmstadt 98 players
1. FC Union Berlin players
FC Schalke 04 players
Bundesliga players
2. Bundesliga players